Ressel is a surname. Notable people with the surname include:

 Franco Ressel, Italian film actor
 Grant Ressel, American football player
 Josef Ressel, Czech-Austrian inventor
 Peter Ressel, Dutch football player
 Steve Ressel, American writer, illustrator and director
 Ewa Ressel, Polish translator